LifeFlight is an air ambulance critical care transport service that operates in the Canadian provinces of Nova Scotia, New Brunswick and Prince Edward Island.

EHS LifeFlight is delivered under contract to the Government of Nova Scotia's Department of Health by Emergency Medical Care Inc. (EMC).  EMC is a subsidiary of Medavie Health Services that, along with Medavie Blue Cross, is part of the Medavie group of companies.  EMC provides medical staff however the operation of the helicopter is sub-contracted to Canadian Helicopters Limited.

EHS LifeFlight is subsidized for Nova Scotian residents and no fees are charged to patients or sending hospitals or agencies in that province.  Prince Edward Island and New Brunswick contract this service and may charge a fee to their residents.  Fees are charged to non-Canadian residents.

History
Most medical air transportation in the Maritimes was historically provided by the Canadian Forces' No. 413 Sqn operating out of CFB Summerside (1968-1990) and CFB Greenwood (1990–present) under the military's aid to the civil power provisions. During the 1960s-1990s No. 413 Sqn used search and rescue aircraft such as the CH-113 Labrador helicopter as well as the CC-115 Buffalo and later the CC-130 Hercules fixed wing aircraft on these missions.

The first dedicated air ambulance service in the Maritimes was initiated in 1996 by the Nova Scotia Department of Health's Emergency Health Services (EHS) in partnership with CHC Helicopter Corporation and the Shock Trauma Air Rescue Society (STARS).  STARS and CHC operated the service until 2001 when STARS opted to not renew its contract with EHS, citing philosophical differences over management and fundraising.

Under its new name, LifeFlight, air ambulance services were operated directly by EHS until 2008 when Emergency Medical Care Inc. (EMC) won the operating contract.

EMC operates all ground ambulance services in Nova Scotia under contract for EHS and is a subsidiary of Medavie Health Services that, along with Medavie Blue Cross, is part of the Medavie group of companies.

From the start of the air ambulance service on May 13, 1996 to December 31, 2003 there were 3,682 LifeFlight missions.

Operations
EHS LifeFlight is a 24-hour, 365 day/year air medical transport service for critically ill or injured patients; adult services are based at the QEII Health Sciences Centre, in Halifax; Paediatric (1-18 yrs) and neonatal services are based at the IWK Health Centre. Many missions involve hospital to hospital transfer where the patient requires advanced medical treatment at another facility; typically at a major referral hospital/trauma centre such as the Queen Elizabeth II Health Sciences Centre and the IWK Health Centre in Halifax, or the Saint John Regional Hospital in Saint John.

To date, there are 82 helicopter-approved landing zones in Nova Scotia that are Transport Canada certified with additional heliports located throughout Prince Edward Island and New Brunswick.  Most of the time, in the case of a motor vehicle collision, the highway itself is used for landing and take-off.  Numerous volunteer fire departments and Department of Natural Resources depots are also used in rural areas of Nova Scotia where rotor clearance permits.

From 1996–2017, the air ambulance service under STARS and later LifeFlight used one Sikorsky S-76-A helicopter owned and operated by Canadian Helicopters. This helicopter was used as the primary mode of air ambulance transport while a Beechcraft King Air 200 fixed wing aircraft functioned as a secondary mode of transport.

In 2016, Transport Canada changed its regulations concerning H1 helipads, resulting in the LifeFlight S-76A model being forced to land at helipads located on the ground and not on hospital rooftop helipads; the only rooftop helipads in the Maritimes being the IWK Health Centre, Queen Elizabeth II Health Sciences Centre and Digby General Hospital.  In January 2017 EHS signed a $105 million 15-year contract with Canadian Helicopters Limited for two Sikorsky S-76-C helicopters for use in LifeFlight service, following Transport Canada certification of this model for H1 helipad operations.  The expansion of the fleet will also provide a backup helicopter for the first time in the service's history.

References

External links
 

Air ambulance services in Canada
Medical and health organizations based in Nova Scotia
Health in New Brunswick
Health in Prince Edward Island